NHPC Chowk is an elevated station on the Violet Line of the Delhi Metro. It is located between Sarai and Mewla Maharajpur station on the line from 6. The station draws its name from NHPC Limited-A PSU whose head office is located at a stone's throw from the station.

The station

Station layout

Facilities

Entry/Exit

Connections

See also

Delhi
Faridabad
Haryana
List of Delhi Metro stations
Transport in Delhi
Delhi Metro Rail Corporation
Delhi Suburban Railway
Delhi Monorail
Delhi Transport Corporation
Faridabad district
New Delhi
National Capital Region (India)
National Capital Region Transport Corporation
List of rapid transit systems
List of metro systems

References

External links

 Delhi Metro Rail Corporation Ltd. (Official site) 
 Delhi Metro Annual Reports
 
 UrbanRail.Net – Descriptions of all metro systems in the world, each with a schematic map showing all stations.

Delhi Metro stations
Railway stations in India opened in 2015
Railway stations in Faridabad district
2015 establishments in Haryana